Servaea is a genus of jumping spiders that was first described by Eugène Louis Simon in 1888.

Species
 it contains eight species found in Australia, with one species reported from Java:
Servaea incana (Karsch, 1878) (type) – Australia (New South Wales)
Servaea melaina Richardson & Gunter, 2012 – Australia (Western Australia)
Servaea murina Simon, 1902 – Indonesia (Java)
Servaea narraweena Richardson & Gunter, 2012 – Eastern Australia
Servaea spinibarbis Simon, 1909 – Australia (Western Australia)
Servaea vestita (L. Koch, 1879) – Australia (Queensland, New South Wales, Tasmania)
Servaea villosa (Keyserling, 1881) – Australia (Queensland, New South Wales, Australian Capital Territory)
Servaea zabkai Richardson & Gunter, 2012 – Australia (Queensland)

References

External links
 Diagnostic drawings of S. villosa

Salticidae genera
Salticidae
Spiders of Oceania